Ethiopian Semitic (also Ethio-Semitic, Ethiosemitic, Ethiopic or Abyssinian) is a family of languages spoken in Ethiopia, Eritrea and Sudan. They form the western branch of the South Semitic languages, itself a sub-branch of Semitic, part of the Afroasiatic language family.

With 57,500,000 total speakers as of 2019, including around 25,100,000 second language speakers, Amharic is the most widely spoken language of Ethiopia and second-most commonly spoken Semitic language in the world (after Arabic). Tigrinya has 7 million speakers and is the most widely spoken language in Eritrea. There is a small population of Tigre speakers in Sudan, and it is the second-most spoken language in Eritrea. The Ge'ez language has a literary history in its own Ge'ez script going back to the first century AD. It is no longer spoken but remains the liturgical language of the Ethiopian and Eritrean Orthodox Tewahedo Churches, as well as their respective Eastern Catholic counterparts.

The "homeland" of the South Semitic languages is widely debated, with some sources, such as A. Murtonen (1967) and Lionel Bender (1997), suggesting an origin in Ethiopia, and others suggesting the southern portion of the Arabian Peninsula. A study based on a Bayesian model suggested the latter. This statistical analysis could not estimate when or where the ancestor of all Semitic languages diverged from Afroasiatic but it suggested that the divergence of East, Central, and South Semitic branches occurred in the Levant. According to current thinking, Semitic originated from an offshoot of a still earlier language in North Africa, perhaps in the southeastern Sahara, and desertification forced its inhabitants to migrate in the fourth millennium BC - some southeast into what is now Ethiopia, others northeast out of Africa into Canaan, Syria and the Mesopotamian valley.

The modern Ethiopian Semitic languages all share subject–object–verb (SOV) word order as part of the Ethiopian language area, but Ge'ez had verb-subject-object (VSO) order in common with other Semitic languages spoken in what is now Yemen.

Classification 
The division of Ethiopic into northern and southern branches was proposed by Cohen (1931) and Hetzron (1972) and garnered broad acceptance, but has been challenged by Rainer Voigt, who concludes that the northern and southern languages are closely related.

 North Ethiopic
 Geʽez (Classical Ethiopic) †
Dahalik
Tigre
 Tigrinya
 South Ethiopic
 Transversal South Ethiopic
 Amharic–Argobba
 Amharic – Amharic is the working language of the Federal Government of Ethiopia.
 Argobba
 Harari–East Gurage
 Harari
 East Gurage
 Silt'e (Silt'e; dialects Ulbare, Wolane, Inneqor)
 Zway (Zay)
 Outer South Ethiopic
 n-group:
 Gafat – extinct
 Soddo (Kistane)
 tt-group:
 Mesmes – extinct (sometimes considered Inor)
 Muher
 West Gurage
 Mesqan (Masqan)
 Sebat Bet
 Sebat Bet Gurage (dialects Chaha, Ezha, Gumer, Gura)
 Inor (dialects Ennemor [Inor proper], Endegegn, Gyeto)

Hudson (2013) 
Hudson (2013) recognises five primary branches of Ethiosemitic. His classification is below.
Ethiosemitic
 North
 Ge'ez
 Tigre–Tigrinya
 Gafat (†)
 Soddo–Mesqan–Gurage
 Soddo
 Mesqan–Gurage
 Mesqan
 Gurage
 Muher
 Chaha–Inor
 Silt'e–Zay–Harari
 Harari
 Silt'e, Zay
 Argobba–Amharic

References

Bibliography 
 
 
 

 
Semitic languages
Western South Semitic languages
Languages of Ethiopia
Languages of Eritrea
Subject–verb–object languages